Shijiazhuang Metro (branded as SJZ Metro) is a rapid transit system in Shijiazhuang, Hebei province, China.

Network

Line 1

Line 1, opened on 26 June 2017. It is 34.3 kilometers in length with 26 underground stations.

Line 2

Line 2, opened on 26 August 2020. It is 15.5 kilometers in length with 15 underground stations.

Line 3

Line 3, opened on 26 June 2017. It is 26.7 kilometers in length with 22 underground stations.

Background
Planning and preparation for construction began in 2001 and 2008 respectively, but was delayed due to the world economic crisis. The projected was approved by National Development and Reform Commission and included in the urban rail development project 2012–2020.

Construction of the first metro station at the Shijiazhuang railway station started in September 2012. Construction at other sites began on 14 May 2013.

Lines 1, 2 and 3 have, in total, 52 stations, 59.1 km length and will cost 42.19 billion yuan to construct.

Phase 1 of Line 1, has 20 stations and is 23.9 km in length. Phase 2 of Line 1 has 8 stations and is 13.495 km in length. Only 6 stations in Phase 2, from Xiaohedadao to Fuze (10.4 km) are operational.

Line 3, has 22 stations and is 26.7 km in length.

Line 2, has 15 stations and is 15.5 km in length. It was opened on 26 August 2020.

Line 1 runs from west to east and then to the north of city. Line 3 runs from north-west to south-east and then eastwards. Each line intersects other two. Lines 1 and 3 intersects at Xinbaiguangchang. The stations of these two lines were named in January 2013. Line 2 runs from north to south.

Future Development

Under construction

Planned
There will be 63.6 km of new lines in the Phase 2 construction plan of Shijiazhuang Metro, including Line 1 (Phase 3), Line 4, Line 5 (Phase 1), Line 6 (Phase 1).

Network map

References

External links
 Official site 
 Shijiazhuang Metro on UrbanRail.net

 
Rail transport in Hebei
Shijiazhuang
Underground rapid transit in China
2017 establishments in China